Altina is the name of:

 Altina, Belgrade
 Altina, Scythia, ancient settlement

See also
 Al-Tina, village in Israel